Common Threads (subtitled Live at the Tractor Tavern, Seattle) is a live album by multi-instrumentalist and composer Joe McPhee recorded in 1995 and first released on the Deep Listening label.

Reception

Allmusic reviewer Thom Jurek states "the quintet creates a spacious yet wonderfully murky chamber music, utilizing timbre as its force for forward momentum. The three-string instruments are given free rein to cover or open spaces inside this mode and create intervals of their own for McPhee and S. Dempster. They create textures in space by employing timbral chromatics of timbre and tonal extension and contraction to achieve their aims".

Track listing 
All compositions by Joe McPhee
 "Spirit Traveler (For Don Cherry)" - 47:30
 "Michael's Cipher" - 4:04
 "Red Enchantment (For Joe McPhee, Sr.)" - 7:39

Personnel 
Joe McPhee - pocket trumpet, tenor saxophone, soprano saxophone
Stuart Dempster - trombone, didjeridu, little instruments
Eyvind Kang - violin, erhu
Loren Dempster - cello
Michael Bisio - bass

References 

Joe McPhee live albums
1996 live albums